Assault Squad 2: Men of War Origins is a real-time tactics / strategy game developed by German company Digitalmindsoft, the modern remaster of the original Men of War. The game was released on August 25, 2016. This is a DLC for Men of War: Assault Squad 2.

External links

Assault Squad 2: Men of War Origins on Steam

2016 video games
1C Company games
Electronic games
Real-time strategy video games
Real-time tactics video games
Video games developed in Germany
Video games set in Algeria
Video games set in Denmark
Video games set in Germany
Video games set in Greece
Video games set in Libya
Video games set in Russia
Video games set in the Soviet Union
Video games set in Tunisia
Video games set in Ukraine
Windows games
Windows-only games